It's a SpongeBob Christmas! Album is a soundtrack to the SpongeBob SquarePants stop motion Christmas special "It's a SpongeBob Christmas!". It is also the fifth soundtrack to the series. It was released on November 6, 2012. The tracks were co-written by Tom Kenny and Andy Paley.

Background
The album was released on November 6, 2012. The song "Don't Be a Jerk", which was featured in the special, was written by SpongeBob's voice actor, Tom Kenny in 2009 for the Spongebob's Greatest Hits album. The album features twelve tracks by “SpongeBob and the Hi-Seas,” including rockabilly (“The Christmas Eve Jitters”), country (“Ho-Ho-Hoedown”), and doo-wop (“Wet, Wet Christmas”).

Track listing

Reception

Critical response
Jessica Dawson of the Common Sense Media reviewed the soundtrack and wrote; "the fun and fresh Christmas songs actually capture the excitement and anticipation in a way that's a nice change from the traditional yuletide tunes we're all used to." and gave it 3/5 stars.

References

SpongeBob SquarePants albums
2012 soundtrack albums
Television animation soundtracks